The League of Gentlemen is a surreal British comedy horror sitcom that premiered on BBC Two in 1999. The programme is set in Royston Vasey, a fictional town in northern England, originally based on Alston, Cumbria, and follows the lives of bizarre characters, most of whom are played by three of the show's four writers – Mark Gatiss, Steve Pemberton, and Reece Shearsmith – who, along with Jeremy Dyson, formed the League of Gentlemen comedy troupe in 1995. The series originally aired for three series from 1999 until 2002, and was followed by a film The League of Gentlemen's Apocalypse and a stage production The League of Gentlemen Are Behind You!, both in 2005.

The BBC announced in August 2017 that three new episodes would be produced to commemorate the 20th anniversary of the group's first appearance on BBC Radio 4. Those aired on BBC2 on 18–20 December 2017.

The series was filmed mainly in Hadfield, Derbyshire; other locations include Bacup Lancashire, Glossop, Gamesley, and Hope Valley in Derbyshire; Marsden and Todmorden in West Yorkshire; and Mottram in Greater Manchester.

History
Three of the four members of the League of Gentlemen (Steve Pemberton, Mark Gatiss and Reece Shearsmith) met at Bretton Hall Theatre School. They met their final member – Jeremy Dyson – later in their comedy career. He does not act as such in the franchise but does have a few small/ cameo roles throughout the series. The stage show began in late 1994, and it was not long before the team took as their name the title of a 1960 Jack Hawkins film, The League of Gentlemen. In 1997, they were awarded the Perrier award for comedy at the Edinburgh Festival Fringe and their radio series On the Town with The League of Gentlemen, debuted on BBC Radio 4. On the Town was set in the fictional town of Spent. They won a Sony Award for this six-episode run. In 1999 the show moved to television and quickly acquired a cult following; three series were produced, the first airing in 1999, the second in 2000 and the third in 2002. A Christmas special was broadcast in December 2000, after the airing of the second series. For television, Spent was renamed Royston Vasey – the given name of comedian Roy Chubby Brown, who appears in the series, notably as the Mayor of Royston Vasey in series 2. Its influence can be seen on later series, particularly Little Britain (the first series of which was directed by Steve Bendelack and script-edited by Gatiss).

Filming took place mainly on location in the north Derbyshire town of Hadfield and consequently had no live audience. A laugh track was added to the first and second series, by inviting a studio audience to watch a playback of the completed episodes as well as the filming of certain interior scenes, such as the Dentons'. The laughter track was dropped from the Christmas Special and series 3 when shown in the United Kingdom.

The group took the show on tour for the first time in 2001, using a mixture of old and new material. In early 2005 a special one-off sketch was broadcast on the BBC for Comic Aid, a charity benefit for the tsunami disaster. In this, two of the most popular characters, Tubbs and Papa Lazarou, kidnapped Miranda Richardson. A feature-length film, The League of Gentlemen's Apocalypse, was released on 3 June 2005. Later in the same year, the League toured the UK with their new pantomime-themed show, The League of Gentlemen Are Behind You!, which ran from October to mid-December.

In September 2006, the unofficial website reported that The League of Gentlemen were to 'reunite' at the beginning of 2007, most likely to plan for the fourth series. Shearsmith and Pemberton appeared on The Russell Brand Show on 22 December 2006. When asked "Will there be any more of The League of Gentlemen?", Shearsmith simply replied "Yes" but was quick to change the subject and not reveal anything about a new series. On the official website, Shearsmith's blog entry for 23 May 2007 stated that the troupe had recently met up in London's West End: "We discussed our next project – it seems we have hit upon something. Early days – but exciting nevertheless."

Shearsmith and Pemberton later collaborated to create another dark comedy series, Psychoville (2009); Gatiss appeared in one episode. In May 2008, Shearsmith confirmed that although he and Pemberton would be making Psychoville without the other members of the League, the League would reunite in the future. The three also performed together in the fourth series of Horrible Histories, in which they play American film producers who hear film pitches from historical figures. Shearsmith and Pemberton also wrote and starred in the black comedy anthology series Inside No. 9, which premiered on BBC Two in 2014. In 2022, Gatiss appeared in one episode.

A one-off radio show, The League of Gentlemen's Ghost Chase, was broadcast on 28 October 2010 for Halloween. Unlike other shows, this was not a scripted dark comedy but a documentary of the members spending a night at The Ancient Ram Inn, reputedly the most haunted hotel in the country.

Speaking to BBC Radio 6 in October 2016, Mark Gatiss spoke about the desire of the creators to revive the programme in some form with Brexit forming a suitable background to revive it.

In April 2017, both Gatiss and Shearsmith confirmed that the programme would be returning for an anniversary special. The BBC announced in August 2017 that three special new episodes were to be produced, to be aired in December 2017.

Writing and inspiration
One source of inspiration is the town of Alston in Cumbria. Gatiss has said in interview that the local shop was inspired by a shop in the village of Rottingdean and that he was influenced growing up around the former Winterton Hospital asylum near Sedgefield.

The majority of the inhabitants of the village – male and female – are played by Reece Shearsmith, Steve Pemberton, and Mark Gatiss, and the script was written by these three, along with Jeremy Dyson. Dyson, not an actor like the others, appears only in cameo roles. As there are usually only three actors on screen at any one time, the different characters mostly play out their own stories in several serialised sketches, rarely crossing into each other's storylines. Only rarely do actors "meet themselves". Exceptions include Papa Lazarou facing the Reverend Bernice in the Christmas Special (both Reece Shearsmith), Les McQueen buying a magazine from Pop's son (both Mark Gatiss), and Alvin Steele buying food from Iris at a supermarket checkout in Series 2 (again, both Mark Gatiss). The idea is taken further in The League of Gentlemen's Apocalypse, when the characters meet the actors (especially when Herr Lipp meets his creator, Steve Pemberton). In the live shows, when Pam Doove was auditioning for a part in the Christmas Nativity Play, directed by Ollie Plimsolls, Pam had to audition in front of Ollie's Legz Akimbo colleague Dave (Pemberton), who said that Ollie couldn't make it "for obvious reasons" (Shearsmith plays both Pam and Ollie in the television series).

Royston Vasey
Royston Vasey is a fictional English town featured in the BBC television comedy series The League of Gentlemen. The exterior shots for the series were filmed in Hadfield, Derbyshire and, according to the writers of the series, the town is based on Alston, Cumbria. The preceding radio series On the Town with the League of Gentlemen was set in the equally fictional and almost identical town of Spent.

Royston Vasey draws on the upbringing of all the League of Gentlemen's members – Mark Gatiss, Steve Pemberton, Reece Shearsmith and Jeremy Dyson – all of whom were raised in the north of England. Royston Vasey is the real name of British stand-up comedian Roy Chubby Brown. Brown played the part of the town's mayor in a cameo appearance.

Description
The town as it appears in the TV show has a sign which ominously declares "Welcome to Royston Vasey. You'll never leave!" The first building many visitors come across is the "Local Shop". The Local Shop is located some distance from the town itself on a lonely hilltop moor.

Events in the fictional town
In the first television series of The League of Gentlemen a construction company called PQ Construction threatens the isolation of Royston Vasey by building a "New Road" near the Local Shop. The project is first delayed when a monster (later revealed to be parts of a goat, a pig and a chimp crudely stitched together by Edward Tattsyrup) is unearthed on the construction site and comes to an end in the final episode when the owner of PQ Construction, David Tattsyrup, is revealed to be the son of Edward and Tubbs who convince him to "live locally".

In the second series Royston Vasey receives visits from both a travelling circus and a group of German exchange students. The town becomes gradually overrun by a deadly nosebleed epidemic which causes a high percentage of the town's residents to experience incessant bleeding and death, usually within 24 hours. Eventually the epidemic devastates the town, with the Ministry of Health running riot in a desperate attempt to staunch the plague. The cause of the nosebleeds can be traced to a substance known only as the "Special Stuff", a highly addictive and mysterious foodstuff served by demonic butcher Hilary Briss, which becomes deadly when cut with sandwich paste. However, the surviving local residents mistakenly accuse Edward and Tubbs of spreading the disease and burn the Local Shop to the ground.

In the third and final series, several of the residents of Royston Vasey are involved in a traffic collision which leaves Lance Longthorne and Laurence Llewelyn-Bowen dead while Geoff Tipps is facially disfigured. The travelling circus also returns.

In the film The League of Gentlemen's Apocalypse, the town is on the verge of destruction when the League of Gentlemen – Jeremy Dyson, Mark Gatiss, Steve Pemberton, and Reece Shearsmith – agree to stop writing for Royston Vasey. This causes meteorites to rain from the sky until the entire town is razed to the ground. The destruction of Royston Vasey can only be prevented when all four of the writers are killed, but it transpires that the entire ordeal was conceived by Dyson while unconscious in a hospital.

In the Anniversary Specials, the town of Royston Vasey is facing a threat more terrible than anything it has faced before: boundary changes that will erase the town from the map forever.  The fight to save the community from administrative annihilation comes from unexpected and surprising directions, all of them local, as the crisis reaches its earth-shattering climax.

Other
The League of Gentlemen book, A Local Book for Local People, released between the second and third series, describes Royston Vasey's history in a brochure, from its beginnings, as mentioned in an appendix to the Domesday Book as "an hutte with a pigge outside" to the construction of the town hall in the late 1930s, as designed by Albert Speer. The endpapers of the book show real maps of northern England turned upside down and with fictional place names, Royston Vasey corresponding to the real town of Settle, North Yorkshire (close by to Panties / Giggleswick).

The town's most featured landmarks include the Local Shop, an angelic war memorial, H. Briss & Son Butchers, the St Mary of Bethlehem hospital, the Windermere B&B, and the local Job Centre.

Filming location 
Filming of the television series took place in the Derbyshire village of Hadfield, located in a Pennines valley. The "Local Shop" is a purpose-built building on nearby Marsden Moor. The opening sequences show a poster for a missing finger. The area code to call is (01484) the area code for Huddersfield.

The League considered a number of filming locations before settling on Hadfield. Another town to feature prominently in the series was Bacup in Rossendale, and the West Yorkshire town of Todmorden was used for some later scenes.

Characters

The League of Gentlemen have played in total nearly a hundred characters, many created in the early stage shows, others during the span of the television series and some especially for the team's film. Most of the characters live in Royston Vasey.

Radio series
In the radio series, the plot involved outsider Benjamin Denton visiting his aunt and uncle in Spent to be interviewed for a job at the local power plant. Not surprisingly, he missed the interview and was forced to stay longer than expected.

Episodes

Series 1 (1999)

Series 2 (2000)

Christmas Special (2000)

Series 3 (2002)

Anniversary Specials (2017)

Film
 The film was made in 2005. The plot is that Royston Vasey is coming to an end and that the locals appear in the real world to try to save it. In the beginning Jeremy Dyson is killed by Tubbs, Edward, and Papa Lazarou.

Live tours

Reception

In 2003, its creators were listed in The Observer as among the 50 funniest acts in British comedy. In 2004 The Radio Times listed Papa Lazarou as the 8th funniest comedy sketch of all time.

Accolades

BAFTA award
Royal Television Society award
Golden Rose of Montreux

Controversy

In June 2020 the show was withdrawn from distribution on Netflix due to the character Papa Lazarou being considered as blackface, following similar action taken against Little Britain by the BBC during the George Floyd protests.

Influence

The series was cited as an inspiration for the later Canadian television series Death Comes to Town, a reunion project for the Canadian sketch comedy troupe The Kids in the Hall.

Books
 A Local Book for Local People (2000) London: 4th Estate, 
 The League of Gentlemen: Scripts and That (2003) London: BBC Worldwide, 
 The League of Gentlemen's Book of Precious Things (2007) London: Prion,

See also
List of films based on British sitcoms

References

External links

www.leagueofgentlemen.co.uk

 
1999 British television series debuts
2017 British television series endings
1990s British black comedy television series
1990s British horror television series
1990s British sitcoms
2000s British black comedy television series
2000s British horror television series
2000s British sitcoms
2010s British black comedy television series
2010s British horror television series
2010s British sitcoms
BAFTA winners (television series)
BBC Radio comedy programmes
BBC television sketch shows
British comedy troupes
British horror comedy television series
Cross-dressing in television
English-language television shows
Race-related controversies in television
Television series based on radio series
Television shows adapted into films